Erskine Castle was a castle, about  north of Erskine, Renfrewshire, Scotland, south of the River Clyde, on the shore.

History
The Erskines were the owners of the site by 1226.  It was purchased by Sir John Hamilton of Orbiston in 1638; it was then sold to Alexander Stuart, 5th Lord Blantyre in 1703.

Structure 
There is no longer any trace of the castle.

See also
Castles in Great Britain and Ireland
List of castles in Scotland

References

Castles in Renfrewshire
Clan Erskine